Kombinator is an independently released studio album by Canadian alternative rock duo The Inbreds in 1994, produced by Dave Clark of Rheostatics. 

Kombinator reached number one on the Canadian national campus radio charts and was nominated for a Juno Award in 1996 for Best Alternative Album. 

The single "Any Sense of Time" received a MuchMusic Video Award nomination for Best Alternative Video.

Kombinator received a 1997 re-release on Sloan's Murderecords. It was reissued on vinyl in 2016 by Label Obscura, alongside both of the band's later albums It's Sydney or the Bush and Winning Hearts.

Track listing

Personnel
Mike O'Neill - Vocals, bass, guitar, cello, piano, tambourine
Dave Ullrich - Drums, tambourine, xylophone, bass on "She's Acting"
Dave Clark – producer, tambourine, drums on "She's Acting"
Dale Morningstar - Engineer
Lewis Melville - Engineer

Trivia
The track "Any Sense of Time" appeared in the 6th season finale of the Canadian mockumentary series Trailer Park Boys.

References

External links
Official site

1994 albums
The Inbreds albums
Murderecords albums